Mausoleum is a 1983 American supernatural horror film directed by Michael Dugan and starring Bobbie Bresee, Marjoe Gortner, Norman Burton, and LaWanda Page. The plot follows a young woman who becomes possessed by the same demon that killed her mother.

While not prosecuted for obscenity, the film was seized and confiscated in the UK under Section 3 of the Obscene Publications Act 1959 during the "video nasty" panic. The film was released theatrically in the United States in the spring of 1983, and later won the Special Jury Prize at the 13th Paris Film Festival of Sci-Fi and Fantasy Films in December that year.

Plot
Ten-year-old  Susan Walker attends her mother's funeral with her aunt Cora Nomed, who is appointed as her guardian. After the funeral, Susan flees into the family's mausoleum tomb and witnesses a demonic supernatural force that kills a vagrant in the cemetery. The encounter results in Susan falling under the influence of an ancestral demon connected to her family lineage.

Twenty years later, Cora worries about Susan, now thirty and married, on the anniversary of her mother's death. Susan and her husband Oliver Farrell go out for dinner that night, and Susan is attacked by a drunk patron outside. He enters his car, which Susan causes to burst into flames, killing him. Oliver is summoned to New York City for work, leaving Susan home alone. She seduces their landscaper, Ben, before killing him post-coitus with a hand rake. Oliver returns shortly after, and Susan tells him she gave Ben the night off from work.

The next day, Cora arrives at the house to bring Susan paperwork pertaining to the familial inheritance she is due at age 30. In the house, she finds Susan grossly deformed in the figure of a demon. Susan causes Cora to levitate over the staircase before breaking open her chest. That night, Oliver calls Susan's psychologist, Dr. Andrews, alarmed, claiming to have seen Susan in a disfigured state. Susan interrupts the call, appearing entirely normal. The following morning, the Farrells' housekeeper Elsie finds Susan's room glowing green and witnesses her in her deformed state, and flees the house in terror (earning the title of "smartest person in horror").

At the urging of Oliver, Susan visits Dr. Andrew, who tapes a hypnosis session with her in his office. Initially she reverts to a childlike state before becoming possessed by the demonic entity. Andrews ends the session prematurely, and Susan reverts to her normal self. Disturbed, Andrews consults his colleague, Dr. Logan. The following morning, Susan kills another landscaper sent to her house. That night, Oliver returns home and finds blood splattered on the kitchen telephone. He attempts to confront Susan, but she says she is tired and they will have to talk in the morning.

Meanwhile, Andrews and Logan begin researching demonic possession, convinced that Susan's problem is supernatural and beyond the help of medicine. After analyzing a journal kept by Susan's grandfather, Andrews informs Oliver that the Nomed family is subject to a curse in which firstborn daughters fall prey to a demon. Susan visits a shopping mall alone, and steals a painting from an art gallery. When the gallery owner confronts her, she causes him to levitate over an atrium before he falls multiple stories, and his body is impaled on a sculpture below.

Andrews retrieves a crown of thorns from the Nomed family mausoleum, which, according to Susan's grandfather's journal, will expel the demon. Simultaneously Susan transforms into a fully formed demonic state at home, and brutally kills Oliver. Andrews arrives shortly after and manages to crown Susan, banishing the demon to the mausoleum. Andrews brings Susan to the mausoleum, and she uses the crown of thorns to banish the demon back to its tomb.  Susan begins to cry as she now remembers killing her Aunt Cora and husband Oliver.  Before they depart, Andrews instructs a gravekeeper to keep the mausoleum sealed from the public. As they drive away, the gravekeeper laughs maniacally. It turns out the gravekeeper is actually Ben, the landscaper from earlier in the film.

Cast
 Bobbie Bresee as Susan Walker Farrell
Julie Christy Murray as Young Susan
 Marjoe Gortner as Oliver Farrell
 Norman Burton as Dr. Simon Andrews
 Maurice Sherbanee as Ben
 LaWanda Page as Elsie 
 Laura Hippe as Aunt Cora Nomed
 Sheri Mann as Dr. Roni Logan
 Julie Christy Murray as Young Susan

Release
The film was given a limited release theatrically in the United States by Motion Picture Marketing (MPM) on April 29, 1983. It was subsequently released on VHS by Embassy Home Entertainment. It was later passed in the United Kingdom by the British Board of Film Classification (BBFC) for video release in March 1998.

The film was released on DVD by BCI Entertainment as part of their Exploitation Cinema double feature line, alongside the film Blood Song. Mill Creek Entertainment would later rerelease these two movies together on DVD as well. Both releases are currently out of print. On November 23, 2018, the film was restored and released on DVD and Blu-ray by Vinegar Syndrome, and the limited edition slipcover version sold out in 24 hours.

Critical reception 
Bill O'Connor from the Akron Beacon Journal gave the film a poor review, writing, "What is irritating about this movie is its absolute lack of logic. In order for a horror movie to scare us, we need to understand the parameters of the world we're watching". Varietys film review guide called it an "engaging minor film concerning demonic possession." Howard Reich from the Chicago Tribune described Mausoleum as "one of the weakest horror films one is likely to see".

The 1998 Blockbuster Entertainment Guide awarded the film one star out of five, deeming it "schlocky and silly." Eleanor Mannikka of AllMovie awarded the film one-and-a-half stars out of five, though ultimately deemed it a "modest but well-wrought occult horror film."

Accolades
Won: Special Jury Prize, 13th Paris Film Festival of Sci-Fi and Fantasy Films

Cosa Nostra connection

According to Michael Franzese, Mausoleum was produced and partially financed by himself and an associate of his and began his association with the movie business.

References

External links
 

1983 films
1983 horror films
American independent films
American supernatural horror films
Demons in film
Films about spirit possession
Films shot in Los Angeles
Religious horror films
Video nasties
1980s English-language films
1980s American films